Resolute Mountain is located in David Thompson Country, western Alberta, Canada, 12 km north of Saskatchewan River Crossing. Its line parent is Mount Cline located 2 kilometres to the east.

Resolute has two main peaks, Lion and Lioness. They are each about 3150 m high. Both peaks are glaciated on their northern slopes. Resolute was first ascended in 1958 by A. Hober and E. Hopkins. The easiest route up Resolute is accessible from Alberta Highway 11, where it crosses Thompson creek.

References 

Three-thousanders of Alberta
Alberta's Rockies